The Albanoi (Albanoi) were an Illyrian tribe. They were possibly first mentioned by Hecataeus of Miletus (550-476 BCE) under the name Abroi. Ptolemy (200-118 BCE) is the first authors who mentions them under the name Albanoi. Their central settlement was called Albanopolis and was located roughly between the Mat and Shkumbin rivers, in central Albania. Zgërdhesh has been identified as the likely location of Albanopolis. Stephanus of Byzantium who reproduced Hecataeus added an entry for another settlement named Arbon in Illyria whose inhabitants were called Arbonioi or Arbonites. Another Arbon which may have been located in central Albania in the same region as Albanopolis was recorded by Polybius. John of Nikiû wrote in the 7th century CE about a people known as Arbanitai in the Greek translation of the manuscript, who have been identified as the same people as the Albanoi.

In the Middle Ages, the names Albanoi and Arbanitai/Albanitai referred to medieval Albanians as an ethnic group. The equivalent terms in Latin are Albanenses/Arbanenses, in Slavic Arbanasi and later in Turkish Arnaut. These names reflect the Albanian ethnic endonym Arbëreshë/Arbëneshë, which itself derives from the Albanoi. In the archaeological record, the Albanoi are mentioned on a funeral inscription in Stobi and Albanopolis is mentioned on another funeral inscription near Scupi. Another ethnonym, Arbaios found in Phoenice is likely linked to them.

Ancient and medieval literature 

The Albanoi may have likely first appeared under the name Abroi in ancient literature. The Abroi may have been a constituent tribe of the larger group of the Taulantii. They are first mentioned by Hecataeus of Miletus (550-476 BCE) in fragment 69 of Periodos Ges. Hecataeus places them near the Taulanti who lived along the Adriatic and the Enchelei. In 19th century and 20th century cartographies, they are variously placed in the upper Devoll or the coastal area between Mat and Shkumbin rivers. Their name may have actually been Arboi as Abroi may have been produced via a metathesis, another linguistic process or a common misassociation by Hecataeus of their name with the ancient Greek term abros to better adapt it to Greek. The name Arboi directly connects them to the later Albanoi who lived in the same region. Stephanus of Byzantium who copied much of the work of Hecataeus in the 6th century CE added another entry about a city named Arbon in Illyria per Polybius and identified its demonyms as Arbonios and Arbonitis.

Polybius (200-118 BCE) mentions a location named "Arbon" in his description of the Illyrian Wars. "Arbon" in a series of mistranslations has been named an "island" or a "city" even though Polybius never mentions it as such. The place has not been identified, and it is unlikely that it refers to the northern Adriatic island of Rab (attested for the first time as Arba by Pliny). An interdisciplinary reading of the passage indicates that "Arbon" might actually have been in central Albania, roughly in the same location as the later Albanopolis (Ptolemy) and Arbanon (Anna Komnene). Wilhelm Tomaschek (1841-1901) considered Arbon to be the "first attestation of the modern name of Albania".

Ptolemy (100-170 CE) is the first author who mentions the ethnonym of the Albanoi in Geographia. The Albanoi are mentioned in the third book of Geographia. They were a people who lived in the region between Mat and Shkumbin and held the settlement Albanopolis. Johann Georg von Hahn first noted that the suffix -polis ("city") was probably added at a later date by other authors as in other editions it is mentioned as "Albanos polis" or "Albanos". Zgërdhesh has been identified as the likely location of Albanopolis. It is not certain if its location corresponds to the region mentioned as Arbanon mentioned by Anna Komnene in the Alexiad about events related to the First Norman invasion of the Balkans(1081). An indication of movement from higher altitudes in a much earlier period has been detected in the distribution of Albanian place names ending in -esh, derives from the Latin -ensis (Vulgar Latin -ēsis), between the Shkumbin and the Mat rivers, with a concentration between Elbasan and Krujë.

John of Nikiû (7th century), a Coptic bishop mentions in the French translation of a manuscript titled Chronicle that barbarians, foreign peoples and Illyrians, ravaged the cities of the Christians and took the inhabitants alive in the Byzantine Empire. Hermann Zotenberg who translated the Chronicle from Geʽez to French rendered with the term Illyrians, a term which in the original manuscript corresponded to Alwerikon. Alwerikon in the Byzantine Greek translation of the Chronicle corresponded to the term Albani(k/t)on (genitive of Albanitai). Constantine Sathas (1842-1912) who first recorded the discrepancy between different translations considered the mention of Alwerikon an attestation of the same population as the Illyrian Albanoi.

Michael Attaleiates (1022-1080) mentions the term Albanoi twice and the term Arbanitai once. The term Albanoi is used first to describe the groups which rebelled in southern Italy and Sicily against the Byzantines in 1038-40. The second use of the term Albanoi is related to groups which supported the revolt of George Maniakes in 1042 and marched with him throughout the Balkans against the Byzantine capital, Constantinople. The term Arvanitai is used to describe a revolt of Bulgarians (Boulgaroi) and Arbanitai in the theme of Dyrrhachium in 1078-79. It is generally accepted that Arbanitai refers to the ethnonym of medieval Albanians. As such, it is considered to be the first attestation of Albanians as an ethnic group in Byzantine historiography. The use of the term Albanoi in 1038-49 and 1042 as an ethnonym related to Albanians have been a subject of debate. In what has been termed the "Vranoussi-Ducellier debate", Alain Ducellier proposed that both uses of the term referred to medieval Albanians. Era Vranoussi counter-suggested that the first use referred to Normans, while the second didn't have an ethnic connotation necessarily and could be a reference to the Normans as "foreigners" (aubain) in Epirus which Maniakes and his army traversed. This debate has never been resolved. A newer synthesis about the second use of the term Albanoi by Pëllumb Xhufi suggests that the term Albanoi may have referred to Albanians of the specific district of Arbanon, while Arbanitai to Albanians in general regardless of the specific region they inhabited. From thereon, in the next centuries, the term Albanoi is used extensively as the ethnonym for medieval Albanians in Byzantine literature. Albanoi is the formal term for Albanians in modern Greek and until the 20th century it was used interchangeably with the term Arbanitai, which now in Greek refers exclusively to Arvanites. These names reflect the Albanian endonym Arbër/n + esh which itself derives from the same root as the name of the Albanoi.

Archaeology 

In the archaeological record, the Albanoi and Albanopolis have been directly attested on two funeral inscriptions. The toponym Albanopolis has been found on a funeral inscription in Gorno Sonje, near the city of Skopje (ancient Scupi), present-day North Macedonia. It was excavated in 1931 by Nikola Vulić and its text was curated and published in 1982 by Borka Dragojević-Josifovska. The inscription in Latin reads "POSIS MESTYLU F[ILIUS] FL[AVIA] DELVS MVCATI F[ILIA] DOM[O] ALBANOP[OLI] IPSA DELVS" ("Posis Mestylu, son of Flavia Delus, daughter of Mucat, who comes from Albanopolis"). It dates to the end of the 1st century CE and the beginning of the 2nd century CE. Dragojević-Josifovska added two lines to the existing reading: VIVA P(OSUIT) SIBI/ ET VIRO SUO. Delus Mucati is an Illyrian name and his home region was Albanopolis (domo Albanopoli). Dragojević-Josifovska proposed that like others he had settled in Macedonia from southern Illyria.

The site of Zgërdhesh, southwest of Krujë in central Albania, has been identified as the likely location of Albanopolis. The settlement covered 10ha at a hill-fort location. Excavations show that the site was abandoned shortly after the Roman conquest of southern Illyria (Third Illyrian War). As an Albanopolis did exist long after as the Scupi inscription highlights, it is possible that the inhabitants had relocated their settlement.

The ethnonym Albanos was found on a funeral inscription from ancient Stobi, near Gradsko about 90 km to the southeast of Gorno Sonje. The inscription in ancient Greek reads "ΦΛ(ΑΒΙΩ) ΑΛΒΑΝΩ ΤΩ ΤΕΚΝΩ ΑΙΜΙΛΙΑΝΟΣ ΑΛΒΑΝΟ(Σ) ΜΝΗΜ(Η)Σ [ΧΑΡΗΝ]" ("In memory of Flavios Albanos, his son Aemilianos Albanos"). It dates to the 2nd/3rd century CE.

An inscription in ancient Greek in Phoenice, southern Albania related to the liberation act of the slave Nikarchos Nikomachou Arbaios is linked to the Albanoi as Arbaios is an ethnonym which has the same root as that of the Albanoi and hasn't been attested anywhere else. Arbaios is considered to not have been a local of the city, but someone who had been moved there from more northern areas in central Albania. The inscription was excavated in the 1920s by Luigi Ugolini. It dates to the 3rd/2nd century BCE.

See also 
List of Illyrian peoples and tribes
Origin of Albanians
Names of the Albanians and Albania

References

Sources

Illyrian tribes
Ancient tribes in Albania
Illyrian Albania
Tribes conquered by Rome
Tribes conquered by the Roman Republic